Sheikh Zainuddin Makhdoom bin Sheikh Al Qazi Ali (Arabic: شيخ زين الدين المخدوم بن الشيخ عبد العزيز المليباري; Zayn al-Dīn ibn ʻAbd al-ʻAzīz Malībārī), grandfather of Zainuddin Makhdoom II, the famous author of Fat'h Ul Mueen, the Arabic text book on Shafi'i school of Fiqh or Islamic jurisprudence and Thuhfathul Mujahidin, the Arabic text book on History of Kerala before and during the Portuguese period. Fathul Mueen was taught in  some of the most renowned Islamic Universities such as Al Azhar, Egypt. He is the builder of Ponnani Juma Masjid.

Sheikh Ali Ahmed Al Ma’abari was the first to move from the Kayalpattanam area to the Kochangadi in Cochin around the 15th century. His relocation was meant to provide religious education to the many Moplahs in Cochin. Accompanied by brother Sheikh Ibrahim Ibn Ahmed Maabari, they settled down in Kochi. Zainuddin 1 was born to Ali Ahmed around 1465. His full name was Shieh Zainudin ibn Ali Ahmad Al Ma'bari or better known as the Makhdum Thangal 1, Abuyahya or as Zainuddin 1 (Some writers mention Al Malbari but it is actually Al Ma'bari). Zainuddin 1 was brought up by uncle Ibrahim after his father died. They soon moved to Ponnani where Zainuddin mastered the education basics and then moved to Calicut for further studies under Quadi Abubakker Fakhruddin. Later he travelled to Mecca where he continued his education for 7 years. After this his next natural destination was the Al Ahsar University in Egypt. The master finally returned after spending another 5 years there. His first observation after return was the oppressive atmosphere created by the Portuguese settlers. To counter that in an organized way, he decided to create a place of learning for the youth and that was how the Juma (Juma Ath) mosque and the open Madrassa attached to it in the lines of Al Ahsar Cairo were first created. The people of Ponnani gave him the honorable title Makhdum (acc to Prof Abdu Rahman). Zheikh Zainuddin Makhdum thence became a revered teacher of Malabar and his weapon to the youth was learning. He brought in the 'vilakkiruthal' (sitting by the brass lamp) ceremony to honor the best students who were interested in higher studies. The Vilakkathirikkuka ceremony is when the most learned student or students sit next to the brass lamp in the Juma Masjid and next to the Makhdum himself. Such a chosen person is  called Musaliyar. As the Portuguese attacks increased Zainuddin worked with the Zamorin in ensuring that there was a united Nair - Moplah response towards them even as a few Moplah traders were happily working purely for profit with the Portuguese traders. The Tahrid jihad war poem was written by him around this period exhorting Moplahs to align themselves with the Zamorin's forces. It was unique in the sense that it was not a religious jihad, but a call for united confrontation towards the Portuguese oppressors. It is believed that Zainuddin 2 also used these verses in his Tuhfat Al Mujahideen which of course obtained much better coverage in later times. A history reader should therefore note that the first record of the times was actually provided by Zainuddin 1 in Tahrid (Tahrid Ahlil Iman ala jihadi abda tilsulban) many years before the Tuhfat was written. These were the writings that prodded the Marakkars forward in their fight against the Portuguese. Zainiddun 1 died in 1522, aged 57 and buried in the Juma Masjid at Ponnani.

The amicable relations between the Hindu and Muslim communities at that time is exemplified by this interesting observation. The mosque at Ponnani was built for Zainuddin 1 (the big Juma Masjid or Juma Ath mosque) by a Hindu carpenter or Ashari fondly known as Ashari Thangal. Even today you can see his signature on the mosque beam. The mosque was constructed around 1519-20, and renovated in AD 1753-54. Until the arrival of the Mamburam Thangals (of Sayyed origin) in the 17th century, the Makhdums were the religious leaders of the Moplahs in Malabar. Parallel to the 'wilayat' concept of the Chistis, the Zamorin used to send a ceremonial robe to the Ponnani leaders during the Ariyittuvazhcha or accession ceremony

After Zainuddin, his son Sheikh Abdul Aziz became the Makhdum of Ponnani. This Abdul Aziz was the one who led an attack against the Portuguese at the Chaliyam fort in 1571. His second son Sheikh Ammed Zainuddin ibn Mohammed Al Ghazali was the Quadi in North Malabar – located in the Chombal Mahi area and to him was born Zanuddin 2. As the Zainuddin 2 was from Chombal in Kunjipalli near Mahe, the Chombal sheikhs or Soubals as Arabs called them are next in importance to Ponnani sheikhs.

Books

See also 
 Makhdoom
 Zainuddin Makhdoom II

References

External links
A brief biography of Zainuddin Makhdoom 2

Malayali people
Indian Muslims
History of Kerala
Islam in India
Writers from Kerala
1460s births
1522 deaths